Shanghai Jiading Huilong F.C. is a Chinese professional football club that participates in the China League One division under licence from the Chinese Football Association (CFA). The team is based in Jiading, Shanghai. They are among the most successful amateur football clubs in the country. In 2014, they reached the final rounds of the East Region amateur championship, while also winning their local league championship that year. The Jiading City Sports Center is their home ground.

History
The club was founded in 2009 as Shanghai Boji F.C. In 2013, they changed their name to Shanghai Jiading Boo King. In 2015 the club qualified for the first round of the Chinese FA Cup, losing on penalties to Qingdao Kunpeng after a 0–0 draw.

In 2017, they changed their English name to Shanghai Jiading Boji. In 2019 Chinese FA Cup, the team entered the fifth round by overpowering professional clubs Yanbian Beiguo, Zhejiang Yiteng and Beijing BSU, becoming the only amateur club left in the cup. Also in the same year, they finished 5th in the 2019 Chinese Champions League and gained promotion to China League Two for the first time in club history after beating Xi'an Daxing Chongde in the promotion/relegation play-offs.

In January 2021, they changed their name to Shanghai Jiading Huilong. After finishing 7th in the promotion group and missing promotion to China League One, they were admitted into the 2022 China League One after the last-minute withdrawal of Chongqing Liangjiang Athletic from Chinese Super League.

Name history
2009–2012 Shanghai Boji F.C. 上海博击
2013–2017 Shanghai Jiading Boo King F.C. 上海嘉定博击
2017–2020 Shanghai Jiading Boji F.C. 上海嘉定博击
2021– Shanghai Jiading Huilong F.C. 上海嘉定汇龙

Players

Current squad

References

External links

Football clubs in Shanghai